The 2002 Salt Lake County Council election was held on Tuesday, November 5, 2002, to elect 4 of the 9 members of the Salt Lake County Council (1 at-large and 3 districts).

No seats changed hands in the election.

Election results 

The Salt Lake County council consists of nine seats: three alphabetical districts are at-large and elected to six-year terms, while six numerical districts are sectioned into separate districts and elected to four year terms.

At-large seat A

District 1

District 3

District 5

References

2002 Utah elections
2002 United States local elections
2002 in Utah
2000s in Salt Lake City